Xylopia latipetala is a species of plant in the Annonaceae family. It is endemic to Tanzania.  It is threatened by habitat loss.

References

latipetala
Endemic flora of Tanzania
Endangered flora of Africa
Taxonomy articles created by Polbot